Pritilata Waddedar (5 May 1911 – 24 September 1932) was an Indian revolutionary nationalist from the Indian subcontinent who was influential in the Indian independence movement. After completing her education in Chittagong and Dhaka, she attended Bethune College in Kolkata. She graduated in philosophy with distinction and became a school teacher. She is praised as "Bengal's first woman martyr".

Pritilata joined a revolutionary group headed by Surya Sen. She is known for leading fifteen revolutionaries in the 1932 armed attack on the Pahartali European Club, during which one person was killed and eleven injured. The revolutionaries torched the club and were later caught by the colonial police. Pritilata committed suicide by cyanide. However, her suicide was preplanned and not to evade arrest. She had a suicide note or a letter with her, where she had penned down the objectives of the Indian Republican Army, Chittagong Branch. In the letter, along with the names of Masterda Surya Sen and Nirmal Sen, she had also mentioned about her experience of meeting Ramkrishna Biswas a number of times in the Alipore Central Jail. Ramkrishna Biswas was waiting his execution by hanging by the British and Pritilata used to meet him in the alias of his cousin sister.

Early life 

Pritilata was born in a middle-class Vaidya Brahmin family on 5 May 1911 in Dhalghat village in Patiya upazila of Chittagong (now in Bangladesh). Waddedar was a title conferred to an ancestor of the family who originally had the surname Dasgupta. Her father Jagabandhu Waddedar was a clerk in the Chittagong Municipality. Her mother Pratibhamayi Devi was a housewife. The couple had six children – Madhusduan, Pritilata, Kanaklata, Shantilata, Ashalata and Santosh. Pritilata was nicknamed Rani. Jagabandhu tried to arrange the best possible education for their children. He got Pritilata admitted in Dr. Khastagir Government Girls' School of Chittagong. Pritilata was a meritorious student. A teacher in the school, whom students affectionately used called Usha Di, used stories of Rani Lakshmibai to inspire nationalism in her students. Kalpana Datta, a classmate of Pritilata, writes in the biography Chittagong Armoury Raiders– "We had no clear idea in our school days about our future. Then the Rani of Jhansi fired our imagination with her example. Sometimes we used to think of ourselves as fearless...". Arts and literature were Pritilata's favourite subjects. She passed out of Dr. Khastagir Government Girls' School in 1928 and in 1929, got admitted to the Eden College, Dhaka. In the Intermediate examinations, she stood first among all students who appeared in that year's examination from the Dhaka Board. As a student in Eden College, she participated in various social activities. She joined the group Sree Sangha, headed by Leela Nag, under the banner Deepali Sangha (Dipali Sangha).

In Calcutta 
To pursue higher education, Pritilata went to Calcutta (now Kolkata) and got admitted to the Bethune College. Two years later, she graduated in philosophy from the college with a distinction. However, her degree was withheld by the Calcutta University administration. In 2012, she (and Bina Das) were conferred their certificates of merit posthumously.

As a school teacher 
After completing her education in Calcutta, Pritilata returned to Chittagong. In Chittagong, she took up the job of headmistress at a local English medium secondary school called Nandankanan Aparnacharan School.

Revolutionary activities

Joining Surjo Sen's revolutionary group 

Pritilata decided to join the Indian independence movement. Surjo Sen had heard about her and wanted her to join their revolutionary group. On 13 June 1932, Pritilata met Surjo Sen and Nirmal Sen in their Dhalghat camp. A contemporary revolutionary, Binod Bihari Chowdhury, objected that they did not allow women to join their group. However, Pritalata was allowed to join the group because the revolutionaries reasoned that women transporting weapons would not attract as much suspicious as men.

Inspiration from Ramkrishna Biswas 
Surjo Sen and his revolutionary group decided to kill Mr. Craig, Inspector General of Chittagong. Ramakrishna Biswas and Kalipada Chakravarty were assigned for this task. But they mistakenly killed SP of Chandpur and Tarini Mukherjee instead of Craig. Ramakrishna Biswas and Kalipada Chakravarty were arrested on 2 December 1930. After the trial Biswas was ordered to be hanged until death and Chakravarty to be exiled to Cellular Jail.

The family and friends lacked the amount of money required to travel to Chittagong to Alipore Jail of Calcutta. Since at that time Pritilata was staying in Kolkata, she was asked to go to Alipore Jail and meet Ramkrishna Biswas.

Activities in Surjo Sen's group 
Along with the revolutionary group of Surjo Sen, Pritilata took part in many raids like attacks on the Telephone & Telegraph offices and the capture of the reserve police line. In the Jalalabad battle, she took the responsibility to supply explosives to the revolutionaries.

Pahartali European Club attack (1932) 

In 1932, Surjo Sen planned to attack the Pahartali European Club which had a signboard that read "Dogs and Indians not allowed". Surjo Sen decided to appoint a woman leader for this mission. Kalpana Datta was arrested seven days before the event. Because of this, Pritilata was assigned the leadership of the attack. Pritilata went to Kotowali Sea Side for arms training and made the plan of their attack there.

They decided to attack the club on 24 September 1932. The members of the group were given potassium cyanide and were told to swallow it if they were caught.

On the day of the attack, Pritilata dressed herself as a Punjabi male. Her associates Kalishankar Dey, Bireshwar Roy, Prafulla Das, Shanti Chakraborty wore dhoti and shirt. Mahendra Chowdhury, Sushil Dey and Panna Sen wore lungi and shirt.

They reached the club at around 10:45 PM and launched their attack. There were around 40 people inside the club then. The revolutionaries divided themselves into three separate groups for the attack; the building was set alight before they started shooting into it. In the club, a few police officers who had revolvers started shooting. Pritilata incurred a single bullet wound. According to the police report, in this attack, one woman with a surname of Sullivan died and four men and seven women were injured.

Death 

An injured Pritilata was trapped by the colonial police. She swallowed cyanide to avoid getting arrested. The next day, the police found her body and identified her. On searching her dead body, the police found a few leaflets, photograph of Ramkrishna Biswas, bullets, whistle and the draft of their plan of attack. During the post-mortem it was found that the bullet injury was not very serious and that cyanide poisoning was the cause of her death.

The chief secretary of Bengal sent a report to British authorities in London. In the report it was written that Pritilata:

Influence 

Bangladeshi writer Selina Hossain calls Pritilata an ideal for every woman. A trust named Birkannya Pritilata Trust (Brave lady Pritilata Trust) has been founded in her memory. Pritilata's birthday is celebrated by the trust in different places of Bangladesh and India every year. The trust considers her to be "a beacon of light for women". The last end of Sahid Abdus Sabur Road to Mukunda Ram Hat of Boalkhali upazila in Chittagong has been named as Pritilata Waddedar Road. In 2012, a bronze sculpture of Pritilata Waddedar was erected in front of the Pahartali Railway School, adjacent to the historical European Club.

Waddedar's great-grandniece is British journalist and activist, Ash Sarkar.

Legacy
 Pritilata Waddedar Mahavidyalaya, a degree college at Panikhali in Nadia district.
 Pritilata Shaheed Minar
 Pritilata Hall, University of Chittagong
 Pritilata Hall, Jahangirnagar University
 Pritilata Waddedar Primary School, Chittagong
 Pritilata Chhatrinivas, a girl's hostel of Kalyani Government Engineering College, Nadia, West Bengal
 Khantura Pritilata Shiksha Niketan (Boys' (H.S.), Girls' (H.S.) and Primary section), three schools, Gobardanga, West Bengal, India
 Pritilata Waddedar hall of residence (girls hostel) in National Institute of Technology, Durgapur , West Bengal, India

In popular media 
 2010 Bollywood movie Khelein Hum Jee Jaan Sey was based on Chittagong Uprising where Vishakha Singh played the character of Pritilata.
 In 2012, the Hindi film Chittagong was released based on the uprising. Vega Tamotia played the role of Waddedar.
 In 2018, Kiran Sonia Sawar delivered a monologue Waddedar in 'Pritilata', a short film in the BBC series "Snatches: Moment's From Women's Lives" to mark the hundredth anniversary of women's suffrage and as part of the 'Hear Her' season. The film was written by Tanika Gupta
 A Bangladeshi film is in production starring Pori Moni .

Gallery

See also
 Khudiram Bose
 Jatindra Nath Das
 Myth of "No dogs or Chinese allowed" plaque in Shanghai
 No dogs or Muslims poster in Algeria

References

Further reading 

 

1911 births
1932 suicides
20th-century Indian women
20th-century Indian people
Bengali activists
Bethune College alumni
Indian revolutionaries
People from Chittagong
People from Kolkata
Suicides by cyanide poisoning
University of Calcutta alumni
Suicides in India
Eden Mohila College alumni
Surya Sen
Bengali Hindus
Female revolutionaries